José Lino Grünewald (1931–2000) was a Brazilian intellectual who was born and died in Rio de Janeiro, Brazil.  A multi-disciplinary intellectual, his writings included poetry, translation (especially Ezra Pound's The Cantos), and essays (major works compiled in O grau zero do escreviver). He also acted in the movie O gigante da America.

References 
 O grau zero do escreviver, ed. by José Guilherme Corrêa. São Paulo, 2002.

Brazilian translators
Writers from Rio de Janeiro (city)
1931 births
2000 deaths
20th-century translators
20th-century Brazilian male writers
20th-century Brazilian writers